G. Nehru Kuppusamy is an Independent politician from India. He was elected as a member of the Puducherry Legislative Assembly from Orleampeth constituency.

References 

Living people
Year of birth missing (living people)
21st-century Indian politicians
People from Puducherry
Independent politicians in India
All India NR Congress politicians
Puducherry MLAs 2021–2026